Arja Kantola (born 13 June 1949) is a Finnish speed skater. She competed at the 1968 Winter Olympics and the 1972 Winter Olympics.

References

External links
 

1949 births
Living people
Finnish female speed skaters
Olympic speed skaters of Finland
Speed skaters at the 1968 Winter Olympics
Speed skaters at the 1972 Winter Olympics
People from Rovaniemi
Sportspeople from Lapland (Finland)